"One Night Standards" is a song co-written and recorded by American country music artist Ashley McBryde. The song was released on September 23, 2019, and served as the lead-off single to her second studio album, Never Will, released via Warner Bros. Nashville on April 3, 2020. The song was nominated at the 55th CMA Awards for Single of the Year and Song of the Year.

Content
McBryde co-wrote "One Night Standards" with Nicolette Hayford and Shane McAnally, and details a woman setting the ground rules for a one-night stand in a hotel room.

Music video
The music video for "One Night Standards" premiered on December 20, 2019, and is the first in a three-part video series directed by Reid Long. Filmed at the Drake Hotel in Nashville, Tennessee, it depicts McBryde working as a receptionist checking in a couple, when she recognizes the man waiting outside as a friend's father. She alerts her friend, which leads to her coming down to the hotel and confronting him and the mistress with a shovel, and ends with McBryde and her friend stuffing the woman into the trunk of a car before driving away. The storyline is continued with the videos for "Martha Divine" and "Hang in There Girl," both of which were issued as promotional singles ahead of the album.

Chart performance 
"One Night Standards" debuted on the Billboard Country Airplay chart at number 60 on the chart dated November 18, 2019. It also became McBryde's first chart entry on the Billboard Hot 100 when it debuted at number 93 on the chart dated June 20, 2020. "One Night Standards" became McBryde's first Number One hit on the Canada Country chart dated August 29, 2020.

It has sold 23,000 copies as of January 2020, and has been certified Gold by the RIAA.

Weekly charts

Year-end charts

Certifications and sales

References 

2019 songs
2019 singles
Ashley McBryde songs
Songs about casual sex
Songs about nights
Song recordings produced by Jay Joyce
Songs written by Shane McAnally
Songs written by Ashley McBryde
Warner Records Nashville singles